The Smithton High-Level Bridge is a structure that crosses the Youghiogheny River
between South Huntingdon Township and Rostraver Township.

The bridge was opened in 1956 as one of the last links in the replacement of the old alignment of Pennsylvania Route 71 with a new four-lane freeway between Washington and the Pennsylvania Turnpike. During the same year of the bridge's completion, it was announced that the highway would become part of Interstate 70; it took on this designation in 1964 after the completion of freeway stretches in neighboring West Virginia linked PA 71 to a similar freeway in Ohio.

Part of a busy truck route, the bridge is part of a highway that has been plagued by surface problems. In 1989, a crack in the superstructure, the result of a 35-year-old construction error, forced the closure of the bridge for five days, stranding truckers. The bridge was rehabilitated in 2000.

See also
 
 
 
 List of crossings of the Youghiogheny River

References
PA Highways: I-70
National Bridges

Bridges in Westmoreland County, Pennsylvania
Bridges completed in 1956
Road bridges in Pennsylvania
Interstate 70
Bridges on the Interstate Highway System
1956 establishments in Pennsylvania
Bridges over the Youghiogheny River